Understanding Trump is a 2017 book about Donald Trump, the 45th president of the United States, by Newt Gingrich.

Synopsis
Newt Gingrich describes his time being with Donald Trump during his 2016 campaign. The book also contains a foreword written by Trump's son, Eric Trump.

Writing
Speechwriters Joe DeSantis and Louie Brogdon developed the first draft for Understanding Trump.

Reception
In the first week of its release, Understanding Trump sold over 37,000 copies. The book eventually topped The New York Times''' Hardcover Non-Fiction Best Sellers list on July 2.

Jake Nevins of The Guardian wrote that the book is "filled with Gingrichian platitudes of this sort. They don't exactly help us "understand Trump," though they do offer a look into the rhetorical acrobatics one might employ to defend the indefensible." Meanwhile, Alexander Nazaryan of Newsweek noted that Gingrich used the word "elites" about 50 times, but does not explain the meaning of the word. Nazaryan also noted that Gingrich included conservatives such as George H. W. Bush and George W. Bush as part of the "elite left".

References

External links
Official website Understanding Trump'' preview on Google Books
Presentation by Gingrich on Understanding Trump at the National Press Club, June 16, 2017
Washington Journal interview with Gingrich on Understanding Trump, June 18, 2017

2017 non-fiction books
Books about Donald Trump
Books by Newt Gingrich
Center Street (publisher) books